Giuseppe Filippi (born 17 March 1945) is an Italian Roman Catholic priest who served as the Bishop of the Diocese of Kotido, from 17 August 2009 to 25th October 2022. He was appointed Apostolic Administrator of Kotido Diocese on 25th October 2022.

Background and priesthood
Filippi was born on 17 March 1945 in Baselga del Bondone, in the municipality of Trento, Italy, during the administration of the Italian Social Republic. On 28 April 1977, he took vows as a member of the Comboni Missionaries of the Heart of Jesus (MCCI). On 26 January 1978, he was ordained priest in the San Vigilio Cathedral, in the Archdiocese of Trento, by Archbishop Alessandro Maria Gottardi, Archbishop of Trento.

As bishop
Filippi was appointed Bishop of Kotido on 17 August 2009 and was consecrated a bishop the following 19 December, by Archbishop Cyprian Kizito Lwanga, Archbishop of Kampala, assisted by Archbishop Denis Kiwanuka Lote, Archbishop of Tororo and Bishop Giuseppe Franzelli, MCCI, Bishop of Lira.

Bishop Filippi was replaced by Bishop Dominic Eibu, M.C.C.J

Succession table

References

External links
 Profile of the Roman Catholic Archdiocese of Kotido

1945 births
Living people
21st-century Roman Catholic bishops in Uganda
Italian Roman Catholic bishops in Africa
Roman Catholic bishops of Kotido